Dr. Richard A. O'Keefe is a computer scientist best known for writing the influential 1990 book on Prolog programming, The Craft of Prolog. He was a lecturer and researcher at the Department of Computer Science at the University of Otago in Dunedin, New Zealand and concentrates on languages for logic programming and functional programming (including Prolog, Haskell, and Erlang).

References

External links
 Homepage at the University of Otago

Programming language researchers
New Zealand computer scientists
Living people
Year of birth missing (living people)
Academic staff of the University of Otago
University of Otago alumni